The Jameh Mosque of Dezful first and oldest mosque built in Dezful, located in the Dezful County, is located on Imam Khomeini Street. The construction of this mosque is a Sasanian architecture style.

See also 
 Jameh Mosque of Khorramshahr
 Jameh Mosque of Shushtar

Sources

Further reading
 

Mosques in Iran
Mosque buildings with domes
National works of Iran
Dezful
Buildings and structures in Khuzestan Province